Vakarai or Vaharai, The Sinhala name වාකර is pronounced 'vākara'.It  is a town in the Batticaloa District of Sri Lanka,  located about 65 km Northwest of Batticaloa. The Anglicization vākari should be preferred to vāhari.

This a predominant Tamil area, and headquarters the Koralai Pathu North Division with a population around 21,000. The residents are predominantly poor fishermen or farmers.

Civil War

Vakarai was the LTTE stronghold in the Eastern province and served as a strategically important city for the  communication between the Eastern Province and the Northern Province. Since 1985 it has served as a major battleground with its control often shifting between the Sri Lankan government, the Indian Peace Keeping Forces and the LTTE. the Karuna faction broke from the LTTE here and the LTTE was pushed out in 2007.

See also
Vakarai Bombing

References

Towns in Batticaloa District
Koralaipattu North DS Division